Larry Murphy is an Irishman who was jailed in January 2001, having been convicted of kidnapping, repeatedly raping, and attempting to murder a young Carlow woman on 11 February 2000, in the Wicklow Mountains.

During the ordeal, Murphy kidnapped the woman and locked her in the boot of his Toyota Corolla car. He then drove to Kilkea in County Kildare, where he repeatedly raped and beat her. She was then locked in the boot again while he drove to Spinans Cross in the Wicklow Mountains where he again raped her several times vaginally, anally and orally. The woman began to fight back and Murphy produced a plastic bag, which he placed over her head in an attempt to suffocate her. He stopped his assault when two hunters came across the scene and recognised Murphy. Murphy fled the area and returned to his home.

The hunters then escorted the terrified woman to the police station in Baltinglass, where they identified Murphy as her attacker. Murphy was arrested the next morning when members of the Garda Síochána (the Irish police force) came to his home. He knew why they were there and admitted what he had done the previous day. Murphy was later tried and convicted of rape and attempted murder. He was released on 12 August 2010 after serving only ten years. His release caused a public outcry, particularly as he had refused treatment while in prison and never demonstrated any remorse. Murphy's suspected involvement in some of Ireland's most famous missing persons cases also contributed to the controversy.

During questioning about the woman's injuries, it was reported that Murphy commented: "Well, she's alive isn't she?" and: "She was lucky", and showed no sign of remorse or guilt. Even though a life sentence was available to the court and would mean Murphy could be held in custody indefinitely, Judge Carney sentenced Murphy to only fifteen years (taking into account Murphy's guilty plea which spared his victim having to testify in court and highlighting the fact that sentences by him had been overturned by the Criminal Court of Appeal) and he served just ten. Murphy was sentenced before the Sex Offenders Act was introduced in 2001 so he is not subject to a post-release supervision order.

Release from prison
There was widespread opposition upon Murphy's early release, and the residents of his home town, Baltinglass, announced that he would not be welcome in the village. After he was released he was considered a high risk offender and was visited by a member of the Gardaí every month.

It was known that Murphy had fled the country and taken up residence in the south of Spain, where he was under surveillance by police. Shortly afterwards he moved to Amsterdam. During his time there witnesses, hitherto unaware of his past, reported that he frequented several bars but was quiet and kept to himself. He drank and smoked cannabis regularly and at times approached and attempted to strike up conversation with young women. In time the media became aware of his location and under increased scrutiny from Dutch police, Murphy fled to Spain through France.

Living in the south of Spain, in late May 2011, Murphy's wallet and passport were allegedly stolen while engaging the services of a prostitute. This led him to consult the Spanish authorities in a bid to travel back to Ireland to obtain a new passport. As a result of his background becoming known, there was much dissension among the local population regarding his presence there. Two weeks later, after his new documents were in order, he returned to southern Spain.

In November 2012 he was photographed by journalists in Amsterdam, where he was found living with a friend, a convicted double rapist. This was aired on a 60-minute exclusive episode of TV3's prime-time Midweek TV program.

In January 2013, there were some local rumours (quickly spread on social media) that he had been seen in Saggart, Co. Dublin, but this was quickly denied by crime journalist Paul Williams, who stated that he was then living in Amsterdam.

In June 2014, it was reported that he was living in South London under an alias, working as a carpenter.

Alleged "sightings" and hysteria
In the period after Murphy's release, there developed what sometimes approached mass hysteria surrounding the whereabouts of Murphy. This was usually, in part, driven by rumours initiated via social networking sites that Larry Murphy was living in or visiting a particular town or locality. There exist a number of dedicated social networking web pages that regularly post information on alleged "sightings". Such sites have come under criticism as many of the claims therein are frequently of an inflammatory and alarmist nature, posted specifically to create and fuel mass hysteria and fear among the communities where Murphy has been alleged to reside. The "sightings" alleged often occur in rural villages and towns and have sometimes resulted in mild panic, in one case resulting in an arson attack on the premises where Murphy was alleged to have been staying. In other cases, the alleged sightings have been a result of individuals who bear a resemblance to Larry Murphy being mistakenly identified as him. Such an incident happened where he was alleged to have been resident at a popular country lodge hotel in the Glen of Aherlow, Co. Tipperary. Such alleged "sightings" frequently appear in the media and when they do so appear, the Gardaí often release statements to the contrary and reassure the public that the authorities are fully aware of the man's true whereabouts. Despite such efforts to allay fears, such allegations continue to regularly appear.

Media interviews
While Murphy was said by his brother Thomas to be a quiet individual who felt uneasy about being in the limelight, Murphy has been the subject of a number of interviews from the media.

TV3 Midweek
On 28 November 2012, a 60-minute exclusive episode of TV3's prime-time Midweek program focusing on Larry Murphy aired. The show featured a rare interview in which Murphy was questioned by reporter Paul Williams regarding his conviction, his time in prison and his alleged links to the other cases of missing women. Murphy again denied any suggestion of his involvement and said that if the Gardaí had any evidence yet to connect him with the cases, he would already have been charged.

See also
 Ireland's Vanishing Triangle

References

1966 births
20th-century Irish criminals
21st-century Irish criminals
Irish carpenters
Irish male criminals
Irish people convicted of rape
Irish rapists
Kidnapping in the Republic of Ireland
Living people
Rape in the 2000s
Suspected serial killers